Josef Reisinger (13 February 1940 – 26 April 2003) was an Austrian speed skater. He competed in the men's 1500 metres event at the 1964 Winter Olympics.

References

1940 births
2003 deaths
Austrian male speed skaters
Olympic speed skaters of Austria
Speed skaters at the 1964 Winter Olympics
Sportspeople from Vienna
20th-century Austrian people